Mont Agel is a mountain on the border between France and Monaco.

History
The top of Mont Agel is occupied by Nice Air Base, itself built on the former Ouvrage Mont Agel of the Alpine Line fortifications.

On 18 June 2011, a light aircraft crashed onto Mont Agel, killing two British passengers. The plane was on a private flight, and was en route from Italy to Troyes at the time of the crash. Conditions were foggy.

Mont Agel is the site of the Monte Carlo Golf Club, formerly home of the Monte Carlo Open. The club celebrated its 100th anniversary in 2011.

Roc Agel, purchased by Rainier III, Prince of Monaco as a summer family residence, is high on the slopes of Mont Agel.

See also
 La Turbie
 Tête de Chien, another prominent mountain overlooking Monaco
 Geography of Monaco
 Geography of France
 List of countries by highest point
 List of highest paved roads in Europe
 List of mountain passes

References

External links

  Map of Mont Agel, Monaco, MSN Encarta.
  Chemin des Révoires, Archeo Alpi Maritimi.

France–Monaco border
Geography of Monaco
Mountains of the Alps
Mountains of Alpes-Maritimes
Mountains of Monaco
International mountains of Europe
One-thousanders of France